Parchi (also Romanized as Pārchī) is a village in Dizaj Rural District, in the Central District of Khoy County, West Azerbaijan Province, Iran. As of the 2006 census, it had a population of 485, across 107 families.

References 

Populated places in Khoy County